Quiet Night In is a 2005 New Zealand film written, produced and directed by Christopher Banks. It premiered at the Stratford-upon-Avon International Digital Film Festival in the United Kingdom.

Plot
The plot concerns would-be novelist Jess Bartlett, who stages a quiet night in to finish her new book, but is frustrated in her attempts by the arrival of a troubled footballer, a manic TV advice show host, a randy old author and his teenage toy-boy.

Cast details
Christopher Banks says he wrote the film specifically with actress and musician Nicolette Kenny in mind, after they had worked together on previous music projects, including a pair of Australasian hit singles.

Richard Lambeth had previously made appearances in the cult TV series Atlantis High and Being Eve, Lucy Gay, Brian McKay and Christopher Banks starred in the gay film festival film All About Reinalda, and Brian Moore appeared as Monat in the TV adaptation of the Riverworld novels.

Cast
Nicolette Kenny as Jess
Richard Lambeth as Rob
Lucy Gay as Rebecca
Brian McKay as Lawrence
Kittichon Helviphat as William

References

External links
 
 
 Review
 New Zealand film premieres on world stage

New Zealand comedy films
New Zealand LGBT-related films
2005 films
2000s English-language films